The David and Julia Watson House is a historic house located at 103 N. Maple Avenue in Polo, Illinois. The house was built in 1900 for dentist David S. Watson and his wife Julia. Rockford architect Edward F. Dowling designed the house in the Shingle style. The house has an asymmetrical front with two large gables and one dormer; both of the large gables include arches with brackets at each end. A large front porch supported by stone columns extends along the front of the house and over its driveway.

References

National Register of Historic Places in Ogle County, Illinois
Houses on the National Register of Historic Places in Illinois
Shingle Style architecture in Illinois
Houses completed in 1900
Polo, Illinois